The 27th GLAAD Media Awards is the 2016 annual presentation of the GLAAD Media Awards, presented by GLAAD honoring the 2015 season. The awards honored films, television shows, musicians and works of journalism that fairly and accurately represent the LGBT community and issues relevant to the community. GLAAD announced 144 nominees in 31 English and Spanish language categories for the awards. The awards were presented at ceremonies in Los Angeles on April 2 and New York on May 14. The nominees were announced on January 27, 2016. American singer Demi Lovato, who was honored with the GLAAD Vanguard Award, performed "Stone Cold" at the Los Angeles ceremonies on April 2, 2016.

Winners and nominees
Winners are presented in bold.

English-language categories

Special awards

References

GLAAD Media Awards ceremonies
GLAAD
2016 in New York City
2016 in Los Angeles